"That Man" is a single by Dutch jazz and pop-swing singer Caro Emerald. It was released on 14 May 2010 as a Digital download as the third single from the album Deleted Scenes from the Cutting Room Floor in the Netherlands, while it was released on 2 December 2011 as a CD single and as a Digital download as the fourth single from the album in Germany.
The song was featured in the opening scene of Marvel's Agent Carter, Season 1, Episode 1.

Music video
A music video to accompany the release of "That Man" was first released onto YouTube on 1 July 2010 at a total length of three minutes and fifty-one seconds.

Track listing 
That Man – Single 
 "That Man" – 3:52
 "That Man" (Radio Edit) – 3:19
 "That Man" (Instrumental) – 3:47

Chart performance

Release history

In January 2015, the song was used in the pilot episode of the American TV series Agent Carter. The song was also used in the season three The Vampire Diaries episode "Do Not Go Gentle" and in the Disneynature film Chimpanzee.

References 

2010 singles
2010 songs
English-language Dutch songs
Caro Emerald songs
Songs written by David Schreurs
Songs written by Vincent DeGiorgio